3409 Abramov, provisional designation , is a stony Koronian asteroid from the outer region of the asteroid belt, approximately 11 kilometers in diameter. It was discovered on 9 September 1977, by Soviet–Russian astronomer Nikolai Chernykh at Crimean Astrophysical Observatory in Nauchnyj on the Crimean peninsula. The asteroid was named after Russian writer Fyodor Abramov.

Orbit and classification 

The S-type asteroid is a member of the Koronis family, a group consisting of about 200 known stony bodies with nearly ecliptical orbits. It orbits the Sun in the outer main-belt at a distance of 2.6–3.1 AU once every 4 years and 10 months (1,761 days). Its orbit has an eccentricity of 0.08 and an inclination of 1° with respect to the ecliptic. The first precovery was obtained at Lowell Observatory in 1929, extending the asteroid's observation arc by 48 years prior to its discovery.

Physical characteristics

Lightcurves 

In 2008, a photometric lightcurve analysis at the Universidad de Monterry Observatory, Mexico, gave a well-defined rotation period of  hours with a brightness amplitude of 0.50 in magnitude, while an observation by astronomer René Roy rendered a tentative period of  hours.

Diameter and albedo 

According to the survey carried out by the NEOWISE mission of the NASA's space-based Wide-field Infrared Survey Explorer, the asteroid has an albedo of 0.24 with a corresponding diameter of 10.8 kilometers. The Collaborative Asteroid Lightcurve Link and others closely agree with these findings.

Naming 

This minor planet was named in memory of Russian novelist and literary critic Fyodor Abramov (1920–1983), whose work focused on the difficult lives of the Russian peasant class. The official naming citation was published by the Minor Planet Center on 1 September 1993 .

Notes

References

External links 
 Asteroid Lightcurve Database (LCDB), query form (info )
 Dictionary of Minor Planet Names, Google books
 Asteroids and comets rotation curves, CdR – Observatoire de Genève, Raoul Behrend
 Discovery Circumstances: Numbered Minor Planets (1)-(5000) – Minor Planet Center
 
 

003409
Abramov
Named minor planets
19770909